All Saints Church (address: Rūdninkų St. 20/1) is a Baroque-style church in Vilnius, Lithuania. All Saints church was built between 1620 and 1630 and was adopted for Carmelites' needs. In the second half of the 17th century, the church was linked with a monastery and formed a single complex.

History

A large old-regulation Carmelite monastery adjoins the church; it is built by adapting existing buildings. In 1631–32, the main two-storey building following the street was completed; there are also several buildings of a later period and a tow-storey novitiate house with a small courtyard at the city wall. In the 16th–18th centuries they actively participated in public life, held religious feasts and processions. In 1819 the Carmelites established a parochial school in the monastery. In 1908 vicar Petras Kraujalis started to preach in Lithuanian, which was opposed by Polish clergy.
The Church of all Saints is at the end of a street where the main gate to the Jewish ghetto was. During World War II, there was a tunnel through the sewers connecting the church with the ghetto. The priest of the church would provide bread to be taken into the ghetto through the tunnel.  He also hid some Jews smuggled out of the ghetto through the tunnel. There were also Christian Lithuanians who helped smuggle Litvaks food into the ghetto. In Soviet times the church housed a museum of folk art after the reconstruction between 1967 and 1975.

Architecture

The bell tower is high and massive with elaborate decorations. After a fire in the 18th century, it was restored and finished with a rococo-style dome roof. Marcin Knackfus prepared project for the church's altar. Above the high altar rises another altar reminiscent of a royal throne with a canopy. A belfry was erected and the sculptures in the interior were created in the 18th century. In 1859 the polychrome interior décor was enriched. East of the church lies a square, in which the Convent of the Barefoot Carmelites once stood alongside a Baroque Church of St. Joseph the Betrothed established in 1638 by the Vice-Chancellor of the Grand Duchy of Lithuania Stephen Pac. Its exterior was reminiscent of the Church of St. Theresa, Vilnius. In 1877 the Church of St. Joseph the Betrothed was demolished by the tsar's order, to be replaced by a market (presently it is a square).

References

Roman Catholic churches in Vilnius
Baroque church buildings in Lithuania